"Pieces of My Life" is a song written by Troy Seals. It was originally recorded by Charlie Rich and appeared on his 1974 album The Silver Fox.

In 1975, Elvis Presley covered the song for his album Today. Released as a single (with "Bringing It Back" on the opposite side) on September 20, 1975, the song reached number 33 on the Billboard country chart.

Elvis Presley version

Recording  
Presley recorded the song on March 12, 1975, at RCA's Studio C in Hollywood for his album Today. It features James Burton, John Wilkinson and Charlie Hodge on guitar, Duke Bardwell on bass, Ronnie Tutt on drums, Glen D. Hardin and Tony Brown on piano, David Briggs and Greg Gordon on clavinet. The recording was later overdubbed by Johnny Christopher and Chip Young on guitar, Norbert Putnam and Mike Leech on bass, Richard F. Morris on percussion, Charles L. Rose on saxophone, Harvey L. Thompson on trombone, Harrison Calloway on trumpet, Ronald Eades on junior baritone saxophone and The Holladays on additional vocals.

During the session, Brian Wilson of the Beach Boys visited and disrupted the recording. Wilson remembered,  According to Memphis Mafia member Jerry Schilling, Wilson played some of the band's recent recordings for Presley. "After a few tracks, Brian says, 'Well? Do you think they're any good?' Elvis looks up and replies, 'Nah,' before leaving. I don't think he had any idea that the guy was Brian Wilson." Wilson then tried to karate chop the singer.

Release 
On September 20, 1975, "with absolutely nothing new to release, and no prospects of another recording session in sight", RCA Victor released "Pieces of My Life" and another song from the same album, "Bringing It Back", as a single. As the Elvis Presley official website states it, "the strategy was not lost on a public that had already bought well-worn material once in numbers that were unlikely to be repeated".  "Brigning It Back" reached number 65 on the Billboard Hot 100, and "Pieces of My Life" number 33 on the Billboard country chart.

Track listing

Charts

References

External links 
 
 Bringing It Back / Pieces of My Life on the Elvis Presley official website

1974 songs
1975 singles
Charlie Rich songs
Elvis Presley songs
Songs written by Troy Seals